Chota Province is a province of the Cajamarca Region in Peru. The capital of the province is the city of Chota.

Political division 
The province measures  and is divided into nineteen districts:

See also 
 Kuntur Qaqa

References 

  Instituto Nacional de Estadística e Informática. Banco de Información Digital. Retrieved December 24, 2007.

Provinces of the Cajamarca Region